Dorcadion purkynei is a species of beetle in the family Cerambycidae. It was described by Heyrovsky in 1925. It is known from Greece and North Macedonia.

References

purkynei
Beetles described in 1925